JND or jnd may refer to:

 Just-noticeable difference, the amount something must be changed in order for a difference to be noticeable
 JND, the station code for Junagadh Junction railway station, Gujarat, India
 jnd, the ISO 639-3 code for Jandavra language, Pakistan and India